Bob Bryan and Mike Bryan were the defending champions, but decided not to participate.
Scott Lipsky and Rajeev Ram won this tournament after defeating Christopher Kas and Alexander Peya 4–6, 6–4, [10–3] in the final.

Seeds

Draw

Draw

External links
 Main draw

Delray Beach International Tennis Championships - Doubles
2011 Doubles
2011 Delray Beach International Tennis Championships